Carabus hummeli middendorfi is a subspecies of ground beetle that is endemic to Russia, where it can only be found on Bolshoy Shantar Island in Primorsky Krai. They are wooden brown coloured with black pronotum.

References

hummeli middendorfi
Beetles described in 1993
Endemic fauna of Primorsky Krai